Åke Anders "Akka" Andersson (2 January 1937 – 15 December 1989) was a Swedish ice hockey centre in the 1950s and 1960s.  He played 132 international games for Sweden, including seven IIHF World Championships and two Winter Olympics, in 1960 and 1964. Andersson played on the famous "Mosquito Line" with Eilert Määttä and Kalle Hedlund.

In Sweden, Andersson played for Skellefteå AIK from 1956 to 1966 and Färjestads BK from 1966 to 1969. He is one of only three players to win the Golden Puck as Swedish Player of the Year twice, which he did in 1961 and 1962, and was appointed into the Swedish Hockey Hall of Fame in August 2012.

References
Anders Andersson. sports-reference.com
Anders Andersson. Swedish Olympic Committee
A to Z Encyclopedia of Ice Hockey

1937 births
1989 deaths
Färjestad BK players
Ice hockey players at the 1960 Winter Olympics
Ice hockey players at the 1964 Winter Olympics
Swedish ice hockey forwards
Skellefteå AIK players
Olympic ice hockey players of Sweden
Olympic medalists in ice hockey
Olympic silver medalists for Sweden
Medalists at the 1964 Winter Olympics
People from Skellefteå Municipality
Sportspeople from Västerbotten County